Chitrakutdham Karwi railway station is a grade A railway station in Chitrakoot district, Uttar Pradesh. Its code is CKTD. It serves Chitrakoot Dham (Karwi) town.

References

Railway stations in Chitrakoot district